The vatër (or votër;  or votra) is the domestic hearth in Albanian folklore. The fire of the domestic hearth, zjarri i vatrës, holds divine attributes in folk beliefs, being considered the sustainer of the continuity between the world of the living and that of the dead, and ensuring the continuity of the tribe (fis) from generation to generation.

Etymology
The Albanian term vatër (also votër, definite Albanian form: vatra or votra), "hearth", "fireplace", is derived from Proto-Albanian *ōtr-, obtained through the *o to *vo-/*va- development which is observed exclusively in the Albanian language as the dipthongization of *o in the two major dialect groups (Tosk ~vatra/Gheg ~votra). It is an Albanian inherited term from Proto-Indo-European *h₂ehₓ-tr-eh₂ <*h₂eh₁ter- ("fire"). It is a cognate to Latin ater and Proto-Iranian *HáHtr̥š ("fire", cf. Avestan Atar). Albanian loaned it to other Balkan languages, such as Romanian and Slavic.

Tradition
The function of the fire of the domestic hearth (zjarri i vatrës) is the sustenance of the continuity between the world of the living and that of the dead. After death, the souls of the ancestors (hije) assume a divine connotation and remain in contact with the family protecting the domestic hearth.

Zjarri i vatrës is considered to ensure the continuity of the tribe (fis) from generation to generation. In Albanian tradition, indeed, the lineage is identified with an original fire (zjarr); the members of a tribe are the ones who come "from the same fire" (pe një zjarri). The fire burns into the hearth (vatër), where it assumes another connotation besides the primordial concept: the fire of the domestic hearth is considered also as a place of common existence and commensality.

In Albanian folk beliefs the fire hearth (vatra e zjarrit) is the symbol of fire as the offspring of the Sun. The place of the ignition of fire is traditionally built in the center of the house and of circular shape representing the Sun. Traditionally the fire of the hearth is identified with the existence of the family and it is worshiped as a deity (hyjni/perëndi të zjarrit të vatrës). Its extinguishing is regarded as a bad omen for the family.

Rose Wilder Lane (1923) provided the following description regarding the northern Albanian fire cult:

A figure which is widespread in Albanian beliefs is Gjarpri i vatrës (the serpent of the hearth), a household divine serpent personifying the souls of the ancestors. Another widespread figure is Nëna e Vatrës (the Mother of the Hearth), a beneficent deity who protects the fire of the domestic hearth. She is akin to Greek Hestia and Roman Vesta. To the Greek and Roman goddesses well-defined public places of worship were dedicated, while in the Albanian tradition the place of worship of Nëna e Vatrës is the hearth of every house. In this aspect the Albanian cult is more similar to the ancient cult of the natural eternal fire of Nymphaion.

At feasts, people used to practice sacrificial offerings to the hearth deities throwing some of the food they prepared into the fire of the domestic hearth and around the hearth.

See also

Atar
Nëna e Vatrës
Hestia
Vesta (mythology)
En (deity)
Verbt
Fatia
Ora (mythology)
Vitore

Sources

Citations

Bibliography

Domestic and hearth deities
Albanian mythology